Pavel Dvořák (born 19 February 1989) is a Czech football player who currently plays for FC Hradec Králové.

References

 Profile at iDNES.cz (Czech)

External links
 Profile at ČMFS website
 Guardian Football
 

1989 births
Living people
Czech footballers
Czech First League players
Czech National Football League players
FC Hradec Králové players
FC Vysočina Jihlava players
SK Sigma Olomouc players
1. FC Slovácko players
Association football forwards
People from Vysoké Mýto
Czech Republic youth international footballers
Sportspeople from the Pardubice Region